Sir Edward Loftus, 1st Baronet (c.1742 – 17 May 1818) was an Anglo-Irish politician.

Loftus was the illegitimate son of Nicholas Loftus, 1st Viscount Loftus by a woman with the surname of Phillips. He was educated at Kilkenny College. Loftus served as the Member of Parliament for Jamestown in the Irish House of Commons between 1761 and 1768. On 16 July 1768, he was created a baronet, of Mount Loftus in the Baronetage of Ireland. He was High Sheriff of Tyrone in 1777 and High Sheriff of Wexford in 1784.

On 18 March 1758 he married Anne Read, with whom he had four children, two of whom survived to adulthood.

References

Date of birth unknown
1818 deaths
18th-century Anglo-Irish people
People educated at Kilkenny College
Baronets in the Baronetage of Ireland
High Sheriffs of Tyrone
High Sheriffs of Wexford
Irish MPs 1761–1768
Edward
Members of the Parliament of Ireland (pre-1801) for County Leitrim constituencies
Year of birth uncertain